Zagato is an Italian surname. Notable people with the surname include:

Elio Zagato (1921 – 2009), Italian automobile designer
Ugo Zagato (1890– 1968), Italian automobile designer

See also 

 Zagato

Italian-language surnames